The Bald Hills are a mountain range in Lassen County, California.

References 

Mountain ranges of Northern California
Mountain ranges of Lassen County, California